Sharif Kandi (also Romanized as Sharīf Kandī; also known as Qezeljā Qālāy-ye ‘Olyā) is a village in Qarah Quyun-e Shomali Rural District, in the Central District of Showt County, West Azerbaijan Province, Iran. At the 2006 census, its population was 299, in 53 families.

References 

Populated places in Showt County